The 2016–17 OK Liga Femenina was the ninth edition of Spain's premier women's rink hockey championship. It started on 15 October 2016 and finished on 27 May 2017.

As in previous seasons, it is played by 14 teams in a round-robin format.

Hostelcur Gijón won its second title, eight years after its first one.

Teams

League table

Results

Top scorers

Source:

Copa de la Reina

The 2017 Copa de la Reina was the 12th edition of the Spanish women's roller hockey cup. As in the previous three years, it was played in Lloret de Mar between the eight first qualified teams after the first half of the season.

Voltregà achieved its sixth trophy by defeating Hostelcur Gijón 3–2 in the overtime with a golden goal.

References

External links
FEP.es

2016 in roller hockey
2017 in roller hockey
OK Liga Femenina seasons